The 1859 Virginia gubernatorial election was held on May 26, 1859 to elect the governor of Virginia.

Results

References

1859
Virginia
gubernatorial
May 1859 events